The Valur women's basketball team, commonly known as Valur, is a basketball team based in Reykjavík, Iceland. It is part of the Valur multi-sport club. In 2019, it won its first national championship.

Recent history
Valur played in the 2018 Úrvalsdeild finals, losing to Haukar 2-3. In April 2019, Valur won its first ever national championship when it beat Keflavík in the Úrvalsdeild finals 3-0.

The team opened the 2019–20 season by defeating Keflavík, 105-81, in the annual Icelandic Super Cup. It was Valur's first Super Cup win and the victory made them the holders of all four major national crowns, the others being the national championship, the national cup and the league championship which is awarded for the best regular season record in the Úrvalsdeild. On 28 December 2019, the team was selected as the Icelandic Sports Team of the Year by the Icelandic Association of Sports Journalists in an annual ceremony held by the National Olympic and Sports Association of Iceland. On 2 June 2021, Valur won its second championship after beating Haukar 3-0 in the Úrvalsdeild finals.

Season by season

Notes1 2020 playoffs canceled due to the Coronavirus pandemic in Iceland.

Honours

Titles
Úrvalsdeild kvenna:
Winners (2): 2019, 2021
Icelandic Cup
 Winners (1): 2019
Icelandic Super Cup
 Winners (1): 2019
Icelandic Company Cup
 Winners (1): 2013
Icelandic Sports Team of the Year
2019

Individual awards

Úrvalsdeild Women's Domestic All-First Team
Dagbjört Dögg Karlsdóttir - 2022
Elín Sóley Hrafnkelsdóttir – 2018
Guðbjörg Sverrisdóttir – 2016, 2018
Helena Sverrisdóttir – 2019, 2021
Hildur Björg Kjartansdóttir – 2021
Kristrún Sigurjónsdóttir – 2013
Linda Stefánsdóttir – 1994, 1995
Signý Hermannsdóttir – 2008, 2009

Úrvalsdeild Women's Domestic Player of the Year
Helena Sverrisdóttir – 2019

Úrvalsdeild Women's Defensive Player of the Year 
Dagbjört Dögg Karlsdóttir – 2021

Úrvalsdeild Women's Young Player of the Year 
Dagbjört Dögg Karlsdóttir – 2018

Úrvalsdeild Women's Playoffs MVP 
Helena Sverrisdóttir – 2019, 2021

Icelandic Cup Finals MVP
Helena Sverrisdóttir – 2019

Úrvalsdeild Kvenna Coach of the Year 
Ólafur Jónas Sigurðsson – 2021

Notable players

 Alda Leif Jónsdóttir
 Ameryst Alston
 Ásta Júlía Grímsdóttir
 Bergþóra Tómasdóttir
 Dagbjört Dögg Karlsdóttir
 Elín Sóley Hrafnkelsdóttir
 Guðbjörg Sverrisdóttir
 Hafdís Helgadóttir
 Hallveig Jónsdóttir
 Heather Butler
 Helena Sverrisdóttir
 Hildur Björg Kjartansdóttir
 Kristjana Magnúsdóttir
 Kristrún Sigurjónsdóttir
 Linda Stefánsdóttir
 María Ben Erlingsdóttir
 Ragna Margrét Brynjarsdóttir
 Signý Hermannsdóttir
 Simona Podesvová
 Sóllilja Bjarnadóttir
 Sylvía Rún Hálfdánardóttir

References

Women's basketball in Iceland
Valur (basketball)